Aaron Sluchinski (born March 24, 1987) is a Canadian curler from Airdrie, Alberta. He currently skips his own team out of Calgary.

Career
Sluchinski made his first national appearance at the 2008 Canadian Junior Curling Championships skipping his Alberta rink of Justin Sluchinski, Colin Hodgson and Tylor Bennet. The team finished with a 7–5 record, missing the playoffs and settling for fifth place. He would play in his first Boston Pizza Cup, Alberta's men's provincial championship, in 2012 as second for Kevin Park. The team finished with a 3–3 record in the triple knockout format, failing to advance to the playoff round.

Sluchinski and his team had a great run at the 2013 Boston Pizza Cup, qualifying for the playoffs through the B Event. They then lost both of their playoffs games to Kevin Martin and Kevin Koe, settling for third place. The following season, he won his first World Curling Tour event at the Black Diamond / High River Cash. At provincials, they lost to Team Koe in the C Event Final.

Team Sluchinski won two more tour events during the 2014–15 season at The Good Times Bonspiel and the McKee Homes Fall Curling Classic. At the 2015 Boston Pizza Cup, they qualified for the playoffs through the C Side before losing to the Mick Lizmore rink in the 3 vs. 4 page playoff game. He joined Darren Moulding's rink the following season and defended his title at the McKee Homes Fall Curling Classic. The team failed to qualify for the provincial championship after losing the Southern Alberta qualifier. He would win two more tour events at the 2017 Avonair Cash Spiel and the 2017 Black Diamond / High River Cash during the 2017–18 season.

In 2020, Sluchinski and his mixed doubles partner Brittany Tran won the 2020 Alberta Mixed Doubles Curling Championship, however did not get to compete in the 2020 Canadian Mixed Doubles Curling Championship as it was cancelled due to the COVID-19 pandemic in Canada. As the 2021 Alberta provincial playdowns were cancelled due to the COVID-19 pandemic in Alberta, Sluchinski and Tran were selected to represent Alberta at the 2021 Canadian Mixed Doubles Curling Championship in Calgary. At the championship, the pair finished the round robin with a 4–2 record, qualifying for the championship round as the eleventh seed. They then faced eventual champions Kerri Einarson and Brad Gushue in the round of 12 where they lost 9–8, eliminating them from contention.

Personal life
Sluchinski works as an accounting manager for The Strike Group. He is married and has two children.

Teams

References

External links

1987 births
Living people
Canadian male curlers
Curlers from Alberta
People from Airdrie, Alberta